The following is a partial list of local, county and regional bird clubs in the United Kingdom:

Online Birding Communities

 chatterBirds

England

 Bedfordshire Bird Club 
 Bristol Ornithological Club 
 Buckinghamshire Bird Club 
 Cambridgeshire Bird Club 
 Cheltenham Bird Club 
 Cheshire and Wirral Ornithological Society 
 Cornwall Birding webpage 
 Cornwall Birdwatching and Preservation Society
 Cumbria Bird Club 
 Devon Birdwatching and Preservation Society
 Dorset Bird Club
 Durham Bird Club 
 Fylde Bird Club 
 Hampshire Ornithological Society
 Isles of Scilly Bird Group 
 Kent Ornithological Society 
 Leicestershire & Rutland Ornithological Society 
 Lincolnshire Bird Club
 Burbage Bird Club Leicestershire 
 Norfolk Bird Club 
 Nottinghamshire Birdwatchers
 Oxford Ornithological Society
 Shropshire Ornithological Society 
 Somerset Ornithological Society 
 Surrey Bird Club 
 Sussex Ornithological Society
 West Midland Bird Club (covers Staffordshire, Warwickshire, Worcestershire and, since its inception in 1974, the West Midlands county)
 Wiltshire Ornithological Society

Scotland

 Scottish Ornithologists' Club

Wales

 Cambrian Ornithological Society
 Carmarthenshire Bird Club
 Glamorgan Bird Club
 Gower Ornithological Society
 Gwent Ornithological Society
 Welsh Ornithological Society

Northern Ireland

 Northern Ireland Ornithological Club

References 

 
Bird clubs and ornithithological societies
Clubs and societies in the United Kingdom